Faith Ringgold (born October 8, 1930 in Harlem, New York City) is an American painter, writer, mixed media sculptor, and performance artist, best known for her narrative quilts.

Early life
Faith Ringgold was born the youngest of three children on October 8, 1930, in Harlem Hospital, New York City. Her parents, Andrew Louis Jones and Willi Posey Jones, were descendants of working-class families displaced by the Great Migration. Ringgold's mother was a fashion designer and her father, as well as working a range of jobs, was an avid storyteller. They raised her in an environment that encouraged her creativity. After the Harlem Renaissance, Ringgold's childhood home in Harlem became surrounded by a thriving arts scene – where figures such as Duke Ellington and Langston Hughes lived just around the corner. Her childhood friend, Sonny Rollins, who would grow up to be a prominent jazz musician, often visited her family and practiced saxophone at their parties. Because of her chronic asthma, Ringgold explored visual art as a major pastime through the support of her mother, often experimenting with crayons as a young girl. She also learned how to sew and work creatively with fabric from her mother. Ringgold maintains that despite her upbringing in Great Depression-era Harlem, 'this did not mean [she] was poor and oppressed' – she was 'protected from oppression and surrounded by a loving family.' With all of these influences combined, Ringgold's future artwork was greatly affected by the people, poetry, and music she experienced in her childhood, as well as the racism, sexism, and segregation she dealt with in her everyday life.

In 1948, due to pressure from her family, Ringgold enrolled at the City College of New York to major in art, but was forced to major in art education instead, as City College only allowed women to be enrolled in certain majors. In 1950, she married a jazz pianist named Robert Earl Wallace and had two children, Michele and Barbara Faith Wallace, in 1952. Ringgold and Wallace separated four years later due to his heroin addiction. In the meantime, she studied with artists Robert Gwathmey and Yasuo Kuniyoshi. She was also introduced to printmaker Robert Blackburn, with whom she would collaborate on a series of prints 30 years later.

In 1955, Ringgold received her bachelor's degree from City College and soon afterward taught in the New York City public school system. In 1959, she received her master's degree from City College and left with her mother and daughters on her first trip to Europe. While traveling abroad in Paris, Florence, and Rome, Ringgold visited many museums, including the Louvre. This museum in particular inspired her future series of quilt paintings known as the French Collection. This trip was abruptly cut short, however, due to the untimely death of her brother in 1961. Faith Ringgold, her mother, and her daughters all returned to the US for his funeral. She married Burdette Ringgold on May 19, 1962.

Ringgold visited West Africa twice: once in 1976 and again in 1977. These travels would deeply influence her mask making, doll painting and sculptures.

Artwork

Faith Ringgold's artistic practice is extremely varied – from painting to quilts, from sculptures and performance art to children's books. As an educator, she taught in both the New York City Public school system and at college level. In 1973, she quit teaching public school to devote herself to creating art full-time.
In 1995 she was approached by ACA Galleries for exclusive representation and is represented by them to this day.

Painting 
Ringgold began her painting career in the 1950s after receiving her degree. Her early work is composed with flat figures and shapes. She was inspired by the writings of James Baldwin and Amiri Baraka, African art, Impressionism, and Cubism to create the works she made in the 1960s. Though she received a great deal of attention with these images, many of her early paintings focused on the underlying racism in everyday activities; which made sales difficult, and disquieted galleries and collectors. These works were also politically based and reflected her experiences growing up during the Harlem Renaissance – themes which matured during the Civil Rights Movement and Women's movement.

Taking inspiration from artist Jacob Lawrence and writer James Baldwin, Ringgold painted her first political collection named the American People Series in 1963, which portrays the American lifestyle in relation to the Civil Rights Movement. American People Series illustrates these racial interactions from a female point of view, and calls basic racial issues in America into question. In a 2019 article with Hyperallergic magazine, Ringgold explained that her choice for a political collection comes from the turbulent atmosphere around her: "( ... ) it was the 1960s and I could not act like everything was okay. I couldn't paint landscapes in the 1960s – there was too much going on. This is what inspired the American People Series." This revelation stemmed from her work being rejected by Ruth White, a gallery owner in New York. Oil paintings like For Members Only, Neighbors, Watching and Waiting, and The Civil Rights Triangle also embody these themes.

In 1972, as part of a commission sponsored by the Creative Artists Public Service Program, Ringgold installed For the Women's House in the Women's Facility on Rikers Island. The large-scale mural is an anti-carceral work, composed of depictions of women in professional and civil servant roles, representing positive alternatives to incarceration. The women portrayed are inspired by extensive interviews Ringgold conducted with women inmates, and the design divides the portraits into triangular sections – referencing Kuba textiles of the Democratic Republic of the Congo. It was her first public commission and widely regarded as her first feminist work. Subsequently, the work inspired the creation of Art Without Walls, an organization that brings art to prisons.

Around the opening of her show for American People, Ringgold also worked on her collection called America Black ( also called the Black Light Series) in which she experimented with darker colors. This was spurred by her observation that "white western art was focused around the color white and light/contrast/chiaroscuro, while African cultures, in general used darker colors and emphasized color rather than tonality to create contrast." This led her to pursue "a more affirmative black aesthetic". Her American People series concluded with larger-scale murals, such as The Flag is Bleeding, U.S. Postage Stamp Commemorating the Advent of Black Power People, and Die. These murals lent her a fresher and stronger prospective to her future artwork.

Her piece, Black Light Series #10: Flag for the Moon: Die Nigger, 1969—which was created in response to the first image of the Apollo 11 moon landing—was to be purchased by the Chase Manhattan Bank, after Ringgold's work caught the attention of David Rockefeller, the chief executive of the bank. He sent a couple of representatives to buy a piece, and they realized, only after the artist suggested they actually read the text on her work, that the stars and stripes of the American flag as depicted also optically incorporated the phrase "DIE N****R". The representatives instead purchased Black Light #9: American Spectrum. In 2013, Black Light Series #10: Flag for the Moon: Die Nigger was shown in the artist's solo exhibition at ACA Galleries in New York, where it was highlighted by the artist and critic Paige K. Bradley in the first solo show coverage Ringgold had ever received from Artforum up until then, preceding Beau Rutland's own review two months later.

In the French Collection, a multi-paneled series that touches on the truths and mythologies of modernism, Ringgold explored a different solution to overcoming the painful historical legacy of women and men of African descent. As France was the home of modern art at the time, it also became the source for African-American artists to find their own "modern" identity.

During the 1970's she also made a "Free Angela" poster design for the Black Panthers, although it was never widely produced Ringgold has stated that she has given a copy of the design to Angela Davis herself.

In terms of the place of painting in her practice as whole, the artist considers it her "primary means of expression," as she noted in an interview on the occasion of a retrospective at the New Museum in New York, from 2022. She goes on to note: "My work is always autobiographical—it’s about what is happening at the time. I always do what is honest to me. I think all artists should try to be knowledgeable about the world and express feelings about what they’re observing, what’s important to them. My advice is: Find your voice and don’t worry about what other people think."

Quilts 

Ringgold stated she switched from painting to fabric to get away from the association of painting with Western/European traditions. Similarly, the use of quilt allowed her advocation of the feminist movement as she could simply roll up her quilts to take to the gallery, therefore negating the need of any assistance from her husband.

In 1972, Ringgold travelled to Europe in the summer of 1972 with her daughter Michele. While Michele went to visit friends in Spain, Ringgold continued onto Germany and the Netherlands. In Amsterdam, she visited the Rijksmuseum, which became one of the most influential experiences affecting her mature work, and subsequently, lead to the development of her quilt paintings. In the museum, Ringgold encountered a collection of 14th- and 15th-century Nepali paintings, which inspired her to produce fabric borders around her own work.

When she returned to the US, a new painting series was born: The Slave Rape Series. In these works, Ringgold took the perspective of an African woman captured and sold into slavery. Her mother, Willi Posey, collaborated with her on this project, as Posey was a popular Harlem clothing designer and seamstress during the 1950s and taught Ringgold how to quilt in the African-American tradition. This collaboration eventually led to their first quilt, Echoes of Harlem, in 1980. Ringgold was also taught the art of quilting in an African-American style by her grandmother, who had in turn learned it from her mother, Susie Shannon, who was a slave.

Ringgold quilted her stories to be heard, since at the time no one would publish the autobiography she had been working on; making her work both autobiographical and artistic. In an interview with the Crocker Art Museum she stated, "In 1983, I began writing stories on my quilts as an alternative. That way, when my quilts were hung up to look at, or photographed for a book, people could still read my stories." Her first quilt story Who's Afraid of Aunt Jemima? (1983) depicts the story of Aunt Jemima as a matriarch restaurateur and fictionally revises "the most maligned black female stereotype." Another piece, titled Change: Faith Ringgold’s Over 100 Pounds Weight Loss Performance Story Quilt (1986), engages the topic of "a woman who wants to feel good about herself, struggling to [the] cultural norms of beauty, a person whose intelligence and political sensitivity allows her to see the inherent contradictions in her position, and someone who gets inspired to take the whole dilemma into an artwork".

The series of story quilts from Ringgold's French Collection (1990–1997) focuses on historical African-American women who dedicated themselves to change the world (Sunflowers Quilting Bee at Arles). It also calls out and redirects of the male gaze, and illustrates the immersive power of historical fantasy and childlike imaginative storytelling. Many of her quilts went on to inspire the children books that she later made, such as Dinner at Aunt Connie's House (1993) published by Hyperion Books, based on The Dinner Quilt (1988).

Sculpture 
In 1973, Ringgold began experimenting with sculpture as a new medium to document her local community and national events. Her sculptures range from costumed masks to hanging and freestanding soft sculptures, representing both real and fictional characters from her past and present. She began making mixed-media costumed masks after hearing her students express their surprise that she did not already include masks in her artistic practice. The masks were pieces of linen canvas that were painted, beaded and woven with raffia for hair, and rectangular pieces of cloth for dresses with painted gourds to represent breasts. She eventually made a series of eleven mask costumes, called the Witch Mask Series, in a second collaboration with her mother. These costumes could also be worn, but would lend the wearer female characteristics, such as breasts, bellies and hips.  In her memoir We Flew Over the Bridge, Ringgold also notes that in traditional African rituals, the mask wearers would be men, despite the mask's feminine features. In this series, however, she wanted the masks to have both a "spiritual and sculptural identity",The dual purpose was important to her: the masks could be worn, and were not solely decorative.

After the Witch Mask Series, she moved onto another series of 31 masks, the Family of Woman Mask Series in 1973, which commemorated women and children whom she had known as a child. She later began making dolls with painted gourd heads and costumes (also made by her mother, which subsequently lead her to life-sized soft sculptures). The first of this series was her piece, Wilt, a 7'3" portrait sculpture of basketball player Wilt Chamberlain. She began with Wilt as a response to some negative comments that Chamberlain made on African-American women in his autobiography. Wilt features three figures, the basketball player with a white wife and a mixed daughter, both fictional characters. The sculptures had baked and painted coconuts shell heads, anatomically-correct foam and rubber bodies covered in clothing, and hung from the ceiling on invisible fishing lines. Her soft sculptures evolved even further into life sized "portrait masks", representing characters from her life and society, from unknown Harlem denizens to Martin Luther King Jr. She carved foam faces into likenesses that were then spray-painted—however, in her memoir she describes how the faces later began to deteriorate and had to be restored. She did this by covering the faces in cloth, molding them carefully to preserve the likeness.

Performance art 
As many of Ringgold's mask sculptures could also be worn as costumes, her transition from mask-making to performance art was a self-described "natural progression".  Though art performance pieces were abundant in the 1960s and '70s, Ringgold was instead inspired by the African tradition of combining storytelling, dance, music, costumes and masks into one production. Her first piece involving these masks was The Wake and Resurrection of the Bicentennial Negro. The work was a response to the American Bicentennial celebrations of 1976; a narrative of the dynamics of racism and the oppression of drug addiction. She voices the opinion of many other African Americans – there was "no reason to celebrate two hundred years of American Independence…for almost half of that time we had been in slavery". The piece was performed in mime with music and lasted thirty minutes, and incorporated many of her past paintings, sculptures and installations. She later moved on to produce many other performance pieces including a solo autobiographical performance piece called Being My Own Woman: An Autobiographical Masked Performance Piece, a masked story performance set during the Harlem Renaissance called The Bitter Nest (1985), and a piece to celebrate her weight loss called Change: Faith Ringgold’s Over 100 Pound Weight Loss Performance Story Quilt (1986).  Each of these pieces were multidisciplinary, involving masks, costumes, quilts, paintings, storytelling, song and dance.  Many of these performances were also interactive, as Ringgold encouraged her audience to sing and dance with her. She describes in her autobiography, We Flew Over the Bridge, that her performance pieces were not meant to shock, confuse or anger, but rather "simply another way to tell my story".

Publications 
Ringgold has written and illustrated 17 children's books. Her first was Tar Beach, published by Crown in 1991, based on her quilt story of the same name. For that work she won the Ezra Jack Keats New Writer Award and the Coretta Scott King Award for Illustration. She was also the runner-up for the Caldecott Medal, the premier American Library Association award for picture book illustration. In her picture books, Ringgold approaches complex issues of racism in straightforward and hopeful ways, combining fantasy and realism to create an uplifting message for children.

Activism 
Ringgold has been an activist since the 1970s, participating in several feminist and anti-racist organizations. In 1968, fellow artist Poppy Johnson, and art critic Lucy Lippard, founded the Ad Hoc Women's Art Committee with Ringgold and protested a major modernist art exhibition at the Whitney Museum of American Art. Members of the committee demanded that women artists account for fifty percent of the exhibitors and created disturbances at the museum by singing, blowing whistles, chanting about their exclusion, and leaving raw eggs and sanitary napkins on the ground. Not only were women artists excluded from this show, but no African-American artists were represented either. Even Jacob Lawrence, an artist in the museum's permanent collection, was excluded. After participating in more protest activity, Ringgold was arrested on November 13, 1970.

Ringgold and Lippard also worked together during their participation in the group Women Artists in Revolution (WAR). That same year, Ringgold and her daughter Michele Wallace founded Women Students and Artists for Black Art Liberation (WSABAL). Around 1974, Ringgold and Wallace were founding members of the National Black Feminist Organization. Ringgold was also a founding member of the "Where We At" Black Women Artists, a New York-based women's art collective associated with the Black Arts Movement. The inaugural show of "Where We At" featured soul food rather than traditional cocktails, exhibiting an embrace of cultural roots. The show was first presented in 1971 with eight artists and had expanded to 20 by 1976.

In 1972, Doloris Holmes, who interviewed specifically for the Archives of American Art, interviewed Ringgold, where she was asked about an upcoming show she was "going to be involved in," to which Ringgold elaborated;
"...this is definitely the first black female show in New York... we have this show as a result of our insistence, and as a result of the work that WSABAL started. This group is not a group of women who are WSABAL. This is WSABAL's show, incidentally. This is a group of artists, some of whom have never shown before, some of whom have."
Additionally, Ringgold was asked about her life as a black woman artist and her views of black artists of the past, to which she tells the story of a sculpture that was created by Augusta Savage. The sculpture depicts two slaves that are rejoicing over having been freed from slavery. Despite the historic and emotional tones this sculpture was meant to give off, Ringgold highlights that the sculpture was, in fact, made with marble, which causes the sculpture to appear white in color; "...you really don't think that these are black people because [Savage] still had the white image in her mind." Ringgold tells this story in order to highlight the eraser of true African artwork and history. Ringgold explains that she admires African artwork, "because it attempts to take the mood and the spirit of the person and visualize that, instead of the human roundness and the suppleness of the form."
As a young artist, Ringgold states that she wanted to express her feelings, yearnings, etc. rather than keep to creating "smooth and subtle" artwork. Ringgold wanted her artwork to be able to be related to by others who viewed it, "and to confront you very much, I hope, like African art does."

In a statement about black representation in the arts, she said:
"When I was in elementary school I used to see reproductions of Horace Pippin’s 1942 painting called John Brown Going to His Hanging in my textbooks. I didn't know Pippin was a black person. No one ever told me that. I was much, much older before I found out that there was at least one black artist in my history books. Only one. Now that didn't help me. That wasn't good enough for me. How come I didn't have that source of power? It is important. That's why I am a black artist. It is exactly why I say who I am."

In 1988, Ringgold co-founded the Coast-to-Coast National Women Artists of Color Projects with Clarissa Sligh. From 1988 to 1996, this organization exhibited the works of African American women across the United States. In 1990, Sligh was one of three organizers of the exhibit Coast to Coast: A Women of Color National Artists’ Book Project held January 14 – February 2, 1990, at the Flossie Martin Gallery, and later at the Eubie Blake Center and the Artemesia Gallery. Ringgold wrote the catalog introduction titled "
History of Coast to Coast". More than 100 women artists of color were included. The catalog included brief artist statements and photos of the artists' books, including works by Sligh, Ringgold, Emma Amos, Beverly Buchanan, Elizabeth Catlett, Martha Jackson Jarvis, Howardena Pindell, Adrian Piper, Joyce Scott, and Deborah Willis.

Later life 
In 1987, Ringgold accepted a teaching position in the Visual Arts Department at the University of California, San Diego. She continued to teach until 2002, when she retired.

In 1995, Ringgold published her first autobiography titled We Flew Over the Bridge. The book is a memoir detailing her journey as an artist and life events, from her childhood in Harlem and Sugar Hill, to her marriages and children, to her professional career and accomplishments as an artist. Two years later she received two honorary doctorates, one for Education from Wheelock College in Boston, and the second for Philosophy from Molloy College in New York.

She has now received over 80 awards and honors and 23 Honorary Doctorates

She was interviewed for the film !Women Art Revolution.

Ringgold resides with her second husband Burdette "Birdie" Ringgold, whom she married in 1962, in a home in Englewood, New Jersey, where she has lived and maintained a steady studio practice since 1992.

Copyright suit against BET 
Ringgold was the plaintiff in a significant copyright case, Ringgold v. Black Entertainment Television. Black Entertainment Television (BET) had aired several episodes of the television series Roc in which a Ringgold poster was shown on nine occasions for a total of 26.75 seconds. Ringgold sued for copyright infringement.  The court found BET liable, rejecting a de minimis defense raised by BET, which had argued that the use of Ringgold's copyrighted work was so minimal that it did not constitute an infringement.

In popular culture 
A new elementary and middle school in Hayward, California, Faith Ringgold School K-8, was named after her in 2007.
Her name appears in the lyrics of the Le Tigre song "Hot Topic."
Her image is included in the iconic 1972 poster Some Living American Women Artists by Mary Beth Edelson.
She is featured in the 2021 documentary Black Art: In the Absence of Light.

Selected exhibitions
Her first one-woman show, American People opened December 19, 1967 at Spectrum Gallery. The show included three of her murals: The Flag is Bleeding, U.S. Postage Stamp Commemorating the Advent of Black Power, and Die. She wanted the opening to not be "another all white" opening but a "refined black art affair." There was music and her children invited their classmates. Over 500 people attended the opening including artists Romare Bearden, Norman Lewis, and Richard Mayhew.

In 2019, a major retrospective of Ringgold's work was mounted by London's Serpentine Galleries, from June 6 until September 8. This was Ringgold's first show at a European institution. Her first career  retrospective in her hometown opened at the New Museum, New York in 2022 before traveling to the De Young Museum, San Francisco.

In 2021, Ringgold's work was featured in Polyphonic: Celebrating PAMM's Fund for African American Art, a group show at Pérez Art Museum Miami highlighting artists in the museum collection acquired through the PAMM Fund for African American Art, an initiative created in 2013. Along with Faith Ringgold, among the exhibiting artists were Tschabalala Self, Xaviera Simmons, Romare Bearden, Juana Valdez, Edward Clark, Kevin Beasley, and others. 

She was included in the 2022 exhibition Women Painting Women at the Modern Art Museum of Fort Worth.

Notable works in public collections 

The American People Series #1: Between Friends (1963), Neuberger Museum of Art, Purchase, New York
The American People Series #4: The Civil Rights Triangle (1963), Glenstone, Potomac, Maryland
The American People Series #18: The Flag is Bleeding (1967), National Gallery of Art, Washington, D.C.
The American People Series #20: Die (1967), Museum of Modern Art, New York
Black Light Series #1: Big Black (1967), Pérez Art Museum Miami
Black Light Series #3: Soul Sister (1967), Utah Museum of Fine Arts, Salt Lake City
Black Light Series #7: Ego Painting (1969), Art Institute of Chicago
America Free Angela (1971), National Museum of African American History and Culture, Smithsonian Institution, Washington, D.C.
United States of Attica (1971-1972), Art Institute of Chicago; Harvard Art Museums, Cambridge, Massachusetts; Hood Museum of Art, Hanover, New Hampshire; Museum of Fine Arts, Houston; Museum of Modern Art, New York; and Whitney Museum, New York
For the Women's House (1972), Brooklyn Museum, New York (on long-term loan from Rikers Island, New York City Department of Correction)
Lucy: The 3.5 Million Year Old Lady (1977), Minneapolis Institute of Art
Echoes of Harlem (1980), Studio Museum in Harlem, New York
Who's Afraid of Aunt Jemima? (1983), Glenstone, Potomac, Maryland
Street Story Quilt, Parts I-III: Accident, Fire, Homecoming (1985), Metropolitan Museum of Art, New York
Sonny's Bridge (1986), High Museum of Art, Atlanta
The Bitter Nest, Part I: Love in the School Yard (1987), Phoenix Art Museum
The Bitter Nest, Part II: The Harlem Renaissance Party (1987), Smithsonian American Art Museum, Smithsonian Institution, Washington D.C.
Dream 2: King and the Sisterhood (1988), Museum of Fine Arts, Boston
Woman on a Bridge #1 of 5: Tar Beach (1988), Solomon R. Guggenheim Museum, New York
 Freedom of Speech (1990), Metropolitan Museum of Art, New York
Tar Beach 2 (1990), Philadelphia Museum of Art; Pennsylvania Academy of the Fine Arts, Philadelphia; and Virginia Museum of Fine Arts, Richmond
The French Collection Part I, #1: Dancing at the Louvre (1991), Gund Gallery, Kenyon College, Gambier, Ohio
The French Collection Part I, #5: Matisse's Model (1991), Baltimore Museum of Art
The French Collection Part I, #7: Picasso's Studio (1991), Worcester Art Museum, Massachusetts
Feminist Series #10: Of My Two Handicaps (1972/1993), Whitney Museum, New York
Crown Heights Children's History Story Quilt (1994), PS 22, New York City School Construction Authority
Flying Home: Harlem Heroes and Heroines (1996), 125th Street station, Metropolitan Transportation Authority, New York
The American Collection #4: Jo Baker’s Bananas (1997), National Museum of Women in the Arts, Washington, D.C.
The American Collection #5: Bessie's Blues (1997), Art Institute of Chicago
People Portraits: in Creativity; Performing; Sports and Fashion (2009), Civic Center/Grand Park station, Los Angeles County Metropolitan Transportation Authority
In the Classroom: Grace Hopper (2022), Grace Hopper College, Yale University, New Haven, Connecticut

Publications 

Tar Beach, New York: Crown Books for Young Readers, 1991 (1st ed.); Dragonfly Books (Crown), 1996. 
Aunt Harriet's Underground Railroad in the Sky, New York: Crown Books for Young Readers, 1992 (1st ed.); Dragonfly Books, 1995. 
Dinner at Aunt Connie's House, New York: Hyperion Books for Children, 1993. 
We Flew Over The Bridge: Memoirs of Faith Ringgold, Boston: Bulfinch Press (Little, Brown and Company), 1995 (1st ed.); Durham, North Carolina: Duke University Press, 2005. 
Talking To Faith Ringgold by Faith Ringgold, Linda Freeman and Nancy Roucher, New York: Crown Books for Young Readers, 1996. 
Bonjour, Lonnie, New York: Hyperion Books for Young Readers, 1996. 
My Dream of Martin Luther King, New York: Dragonfly Books, 1996. 
The Invisible Princess, New York: Crown Books for Young Readers, 1998 (1st ed.); New York: Dragonfly Books, 2001. 
If a Bus Could Talk: The Story of Rosa Parks, New York: Simon & Schuster Books for Young People, 1999 (1st ed.); Aladdin Books (Simon & Schuster), 2001. 
Counting to Tar Beach: A Tar Beach Board Book, New York: Crown Books for Young Readers, 1999. 
Cassie's Colorful Day: A Tar Beach Board Book, New York: Crown Books for Young Readers, 1999. 
Cassie's Word Quilt, New York: Knopf Books for Young Readers, 2002 (1st ed.); Dragonfly Books, 2004; Random House Children's Books, 2012. 
Faith Ringgold: A View from the Studio by Curlee Raven Holton and Faith Ringgold, Boston: Bunker Hill Publishing in association with the Allentown Art Museum, 2004. 
O Holy Night: Christmas with the Boys Choir of Harlem, New York: Amistad (HarperCollins), 2004. 
What Will You Do for Peace? Impact of 9/11 on New York City Youth, introduction by Faith Ringgold, Hamden, Connecticut: InterRelations Collaborative, 2004. 
The Three Witches by Zora Neale Hurston, adapted by Joyce Carol Thomas, illustrated by Faith Ringgold, New York: HarperCollins, 2006. 
Henry Ossawa Tanner: His Boyhood Dream Comes True, Piermont, New Hampshire: Bunker Hill Publishing in association with the Pennsylvania Academy of the Fine Arts, 2011. 
Bronzeville Boys and Girls (poetry) by Gwendolyn Brooks, illustrated by Faith Ringgold, New York: Amistad, 2007 (1st ed.); HarperCollins, 2015. 
Harlem Renaissance Party, New York: Amistad, 2015. 
A Letter to my Daughter, Michele: in response to her book, Black Macho and the Myth of the Superwoman, North Charleston, South Carolina: CreateSpace Independent Publishing Platform, 2015 (written 1980). 
We Came to America, New York: Knopf, 2016 (1st ed.); Dragonfly Books, 2022. 
Faith Ringgold: Politics / Power by Faith Ringgold, Michele Wallace, and Kirsten Weiss, Berlin: Weiss Publications, 2022.

See also
 Feminist art movement in the United States
 Black feminism
 Harlem Renaissance
 Quilts
 Sculpture
 Painting

References

Further reading 

Faith Ringgold Biography Activist, Painter, Civil Rights Activist, Women's Rights Activist, Author, Educator (1930–)

External links

 
Faith Ringgold Blog
Faith Ringgold Works
Faith Ringgold Biography and Interviews
Interview with Faith Ringgold about "American People Series #20: Die", 1967
 Barbara Faith Company blog – everything about Faith Ringgold
Faith Ringgold’s oral history video excerpts at The National Visionary Leadership Project
Faith Ringgold on DVD, at work, her inspiration and craft – films by Linda Freeman, L&S Video
Faith Ringgold Society  , an organization devoted to the study of Ringgold's life and work
 
 Faith Ringgold at Brooklyn Museum, Feminist Art Statement
Oral history interview with Faith Ringgold, 1972, Archives of American Art, Smithsonian Institution
Interview with Faith Ringgold about her art and writing, All About Kids! TV Series #188 (1994)

American women painters
African-American women artists
Activists for African-American civil rights
American contemporary painters
Feminist artists
1930 births
Living people
American textile artists
African-American feminists
American feminists
City College of New York alumni
20th-century American painters
20th-century American women artists
American women printmakers
20th-century American printmakers
People from Englewood, New Jersey
Women textile artists
21st-century American women artists
African-American printmakers
Quilters
Harlem Renaissance
20th-century African-American women
20th-century African-American painters
21st-century African-American women